Blueprint for Robbery is a 1961 American crime film directed by Jerry Hopper and written by Irwin Winehouse and A. Sanford Wolf. The film stars J. Pat O'Malley, Robert J. Wilke, Robert Gist, Romo Vincent, Jay Barney and Henry Corden. The film was released on February 1, 1961, by Paramount Pictures.

Plot
A gang plots the robbery of an armored-car company headquarters. Although the robbery itself goes off as planned, it's not long before the gang members are fighting among themselves over everybody's share of the loot and trying to avoid capture by the police, who are pouring all their resources into capturing the robbers. Based on a real-life 1950 Brinks Armored Car Co. robbery in Boston.

Cast        
J. Pat O'Malley as	Pop Kane
Robert J. Wilke as Capt. Swanson
Robert Gist as Chips McGann
Romo Vincent as Fatso Bonelli
Jay Barney as Red Mack
Henry Corden as Preacher Doc
Tom Duggan as District Attorney James Livingston
Sherwood Price as Gus Romay
Robert Carricart as Gyp Grogan
Johnny Indrisano as Nick Tony
Paul Salata as Rocky
Joe Conley as Jock McGee
Marion Ross as Young Woman
Barbara Mansell as Bar Girl

References

External links
 
 

1961 films
American crime films
1961 crime films
Paramount Pictures films
Films directed by Jerry Hopper
1960s English-language films
1960s American films